Orthotylus tenellus is a species of bug from a family of Miridae that can be found in Benelux, Eastern Europe (except for Lithuania and Russia), Czech Republic, France, Germany, Greece, Italy, Moldova, Poland, Scandinavia, Slovakia, the United Kingdom, and northern states of former Yugoslavia.

Description

Ecology
The species are feeding on trees like: oak, ash, and hazel.

Subspecies
Orthotylus tenellus meridionalis Josifov, 2006
Orthotylus tenellus tenellus (Fallen, 1807)

References

Insects described in 1807
Hemiptera of Europe
tenellus
Taxa named by Carl Fredrik Fallén